Bursadella tonans is a moth in the family Immidae. It was described by Edward Meyrick in 1925. It is found in New Guinea.

The wingspan is 32–36 mm. The forewings are ochreous yellow, with purple-black markings. There is a costal streak to the apical patch, and dorsal streak to about three-fourths. There is also a basal mark from which rise streaks above and below the cell diverging from a point and not reaching the middle, and a streak below the fold parallel to the lower of these. A large apical patch, the edge rather concave and running from the middle of the costa to the tornus, encloses a subcrescentic transverse ochreous-yellow streak before the apex. The hindwings are black with a curved ochreous-yellow fascia from the costa posteriorly to near the middle of the termen, widest on the costa and narrowed to a point beneath, leaving a black marginal streak around the apex and termen.

References

Moths described in 1925
Immidae
Moths of Asia